The Sundering is a series of two fantasy novels by Jacqueline Carey made up of Banewreaker, and Godslayer. The books portray a conflict between light and dark, with many of the common conventions of fantasy fiction. The world and many of the characters of the novels are similar to those found in J. R. R. Tolkien's The Lord of the Rings, as Carey presents a similar story as a tragedy told from the "dark" side's perspective. Though one side can be considered light, consisting of Elf-like creatures, Men, and Dwarves, and the other dark, with an army of Trolls, neither can be considered solely "good" or "evil".

Novels
The Sundering consists of the following novels (with release dates). This is also the chronological order within the story.
 Banewreaker (2004)
 Godslayer (2005)

Background
The events of the novels are a continuation of the Shaper's War.  The Shapers are the gods of this world.  The world is the body of the first being, Uru-Alat, who had a mystic jewel in his forehead.  After Uru-Alat's death, the Shapers sprang from his body, each shaper coming from a different part (head, heart, etc.).  Haomane, who came first and from the head, is the god of thought; he claimed leadership of the Shapers.  Out of love for Arahila, Satoris refused Haomane's command to remove his gift (reproduction) from the race Arahila created (mankind).  This led to a fight between Haomane and Satoris, during which the mystic jewel shattered and the world was sundered in two.  The largest shard of the jewel was like a sword and was named God Slayer.  Oronin Last-Born stabbed Satoris in the leg with God Slayer, but the wound was only crippling, not mortal.  Satoris seized God Slayer and fled the realm of the Gods to the newly isolated realm of mortals.  Haomane, afraid to follow himself for fear of the sword, sent agents to the mortal lands in order to recover God Slayer; he provided his agents with tiny fragments of the mystic jewel.

Over the years, Satoris has established himself in his citadel of Darkhaven, with his own agents and allies (trolls, weres and certain human kingdoms).  Only one of Haomane's agents remain, leading the rest of the mortal world against Satoris (Elves and most human kingdoms).

At the time of the story, Haomane's remaining agent, Malthus, is trying to bring about a prophecy that foretells the downfall of Satoris, primarily through a youth named Dani.  Satoris' men work to prevent the prophecy's fulfillment.

The Shapers
Haomane First-BornThe first of the Shapers and has become the leader of the Six in facing the Sunderer.  He created the Ellylon, who are immortal except if killed by steel. His Gift is thought, for which he is named Lord-of-Thought. He gave this Gift only to Elyll and Man, making them more intelligent than the other sapient races.
Arahila the FairBorn-of-the-Heart. Creator of mankind.  Her gifts are grace, compassion, and love.
Satoris Third-BornThe leader of the forces of Darkhaven. Once named "The Sower" because of his gift -- quickening of the flesh (Reproduction) -- His enemies have named him "Banewreaker" and "The Sunderer".
Neheris-of-the-Leaping-WatersCreator of mountains and the Fjelltroll.
Meronin Fifth-BornCreator of the deep seas.
Yrinna-of-the-FruitsCreator of plants and the peaceful Dwarves.
Oronin Last-BornCreator of Death and the Were.

Major characters
Lord General Tanaros Caveros BlackswordThe main point-of-view character through the series, Darkhaven's military leader. He is one of the Three --lieutenants of Satoris that were made immortal -- He came to Satoris after murdering his wife and his king who had an affair and a child together -- an act that earned him the name "Kingslayer."
Ushahin DreamspinnerAnother of the Three, Darkhaven's spymaster. A half-breed human/Ellylon, hated by both races and mutilated as a child, he was raised by the Were and now welcomes the insane and unwanted to Darkhaven.
Lord VoraxA Staccian and one of the Three.  Darkhaven's primary diplomat.
CerelindeAn Ellyon princess and betrothed of Aracus Altorus.  Their wedding would fulfill one of the requirements of the prophecy that foretells Satoris' downfall.
Blaise CavarosA distant descended relative of General Tanaros.  A soldier working for the opponents of Darkhaven, trying to reclaim the honor of his family which was lost long ago when General Tanaros killed his king and defected to Satoris.
Aracus AltorusBetrothed of Cerelinde.  A descendant of the child that Tanaros' wife had had with his King.
Malthus the Wise A mage, sent long ago by Haomane to defeat Satoris and recover the sword Godslayer.  He still bears one of the fragments of the mystic jewel.
Lilias The Sorceress of Beshtanag who has obtained one of the fragments of the mystic jewel.
Dani the BearerA Yarru youth who is key to bringing about the prophecy of Satoris' end.  He is the only one who can carry the means of quenching the fires of Darkhaven.
Thulu A Yarru man, Uncle and guide to Dani

References

External links
 

Fantasy novel series
American fantasy novel series